Middlesbrough East was a parliamentary constituency in the town of Middlesbrough in North East England.  It returned one Member of Parliament (MP) to the House of Commons of the Parliament of the United Kingdom, elected by the first-past-the-post voting system.

The constituency was created for the 1918 general election, and abolished for the February 1974 general election.

Boundaries
1918–1950: The County Borough of Middlesbrough wards of Exchange, Grove Hill, Ormesby, St Hilda's, and Vulcan.

1950–1955: The County Borough of Middlesbrough except the wards of Acklam, Ayresome, and Linthorpe.

1955–1974: The County Borough of Middlesbrough wards of Berwick Hills, Cannon, Clairville, Exchange, Grove Hill, Newport, North Ormesby, St Hilda's, Thorntree, and Tollesby.

Members of Parliament

Election results

Elections in the 1910s 

 Williams was issued with the Coalition Coupon, but repudiated it.

Elections in the 1920s

Elections in the 1930s

Elections in the 1940s
General Election 1939–40:

Another General Election was required to take place before the end of 1940. The political parties had been making preparations for an election to take place from 1939 and by the end of this year, the following candidates had been selected; 
Labour: Alfred Edwards 
Conservative: Benjamin Chetwynd-Talbot

Elections in the 1950s

Elections in the 1960s

Election in the 1970s

References 

Parliamentary constituencies in North East England (historic)
Constituencies of the Parliament of the United Kingdom established in 1918
Constituencies of the Parliament of the United Kingdom disestablished in 1974
Politics of Middlesbrough